Ventsia tricarinata is a species of sea snail, a marine gastropod mollusk, unassigned in the superfamily Seguenzioidea.

Distribution
This marine species occurs at a hydrothermal vent at the Lau Basin also off Fiji.

References

External links
  Kunze T., Heß M. & Haszprunar G. (2016). 3D-interactive microanatomy of Ventsia tricarinata Warén & Bouchet, 1993 (Vetigastropoda: Seguenzioidea) from Pacific hydrothermal vents. Journal of Molluscan Studies. 82(3): 366-377
 To Barcode of Life (1 barcode)
 To Encyclopedia of Life
 To GenBank (4 nucleotides; 2 proteins)
 To World Register of Marine Species

tricarinata
Gastropods described in 1993